No Place For Us is the debut EP by ambient techno act The Sight Below, released on August 26, 2008 by Ghostly International. It is available as a free, promotional download on the label's website. The EP was recorded live in Seattle, Washington during the winter of 2007–2008. It is equally influenced by shoegaze and ambient techno. 

Each track also has its own individual artwork. In addition, at the bottom of the "back cover" artwork that contains the credits, the artist simply states to the reader,"Share this music."

The opening track, No Place For Us, is reminiscent of William Basinski's The Disintegration Loops, Biosphere and Wolfgang Voigt's Gas project.

Track listing
All songs written by The Sight Below

"No Place For Us" - 6:16
"With Her Kiss (I'd Pass The Sky)" - 6:25
"Twice Failed" - 4:31

Personnel
The Sight Below — Production, Mixing, Guitars, Laptop
Michael Cina — Artwork design
Stefan Betke — Mastering at Scape Mastering (Berlin, Germany)

References

External links
Ghostly International release page

The Sight Below albums
2008 EPs
Ghostly International EPs